In Pakistan, a medical school is more often referred to as a medical college. A medical college is affiliated with a university as a department which usually has a separate campus. The medical schools in Karachi are both private and public.

List of medical colleges

Karachi University
University of Karachi announced in September 2014 that it will establish its own medical college and a 100-bed hospital. The admission in the college for 100 students will be started in November 2014.

See also
Medical school
List of medical schools
List of medical organizations in Pakistan
Pakistan Medical and Dental Council
List of medical schools in Sindh
United Medical and Dental College

References

Education in Karachi
Karachi
Karachi-related lists